Pierre Ngendandumwe (1930 – 15 January 1965) was a Burundian politician. He was a member of the Union for National Progress and was an ethnic Hutu. On 18 June 1963, about a year after Burundi gained independence and amidst efforts to bring about political cooperation between Hutus and the dominant minority Tutsis, Ngendandumwe became Burundi's first Hutu prime minister. He served as prime minister until 6 April 1964 and then became prime minister again on 7 January 1965, serving until his death. Eight days after beginning his second term, he was assassinated by a Rwandan Tutsi refugee.

Early life 
Pierre Ngendandumwe was born in 1930 in Ngozi Province, Burundi. He came from a prosperous Hutu family. In 1959 he earned a degree in political science from Lovanium University in the Belgian Congo. That year he bemoaned the domination of Urundi's administration by the Tutsi minority ethnic group.

Career 
Following the completion of his education, Ngendandumwe worked in the Belgian colonial administration as an assistant territorial administrator. He supported Prince Louis Rwagasore and was a member of his political party, the Union for National Progress (UPRONA). In July 1961 he was appointed Minister of Finance in the caretaker of government of national union assembled by the Belgian administration. National elections were held and won by UPRONA; Ngendandumwe became the only member of the Legislative Assembly to hold a university degree.

The Legislative Assembly met on 28 September to invest a new government with Rwagasore acting as formateur. In a secret ballot, most deputies expressed their desire for Rwagasore to become the new prime minister, though two indicated their preference for Ngendandumwe. Rwagasore ultimately became prime minister with Ngendandumwe serving as Vice Prime Minister and Minister of Finance. On 13 October Rwagosore was assassinated. André Muhirwa was named Prime Minister to replace him, while Ngendandumwe continued to serve as Vice Prime Minister. Upon the death of Rwagosore, UPRONA developed two factions which became known as the "Casablanca group" and the "Monrovia group". The former was dominated by Tutsis and anti-Western in its ideological orientation. The latter was led by Hutus and leaned either pro-West or neutral towards it. Ngendandumwe was associated with the Monrovia group.

In December Belgian Foreign Minister Paul-Henri Spaak summoned Rwandan and Burundian representatives to Brussels to discuss the future of their territory. Ngendandumwe led the Burundian delegation. He signed an agreement with Spaak, guaranteeing Burundi internal autonomy in most matters until independence. On 18 January 1962 he and the President of the Legislative Assembly of Ruanda appealed to the United Nations General Assembly to permit the independence of Ruanda-Urundi as two separate states.  The National Assembly appointed him to the Mwami Mwambutsa IV's Crown Council on 22 May 1963.

Muhirwa's government, facing increasing opposition in the Assembly and from the crown, resigned in early June 1963. The Mwami asked Ngendandumwe to form a new government on 11 June. He became Prime Minister of Burundi on 18 June 1963, the first Hutu to hold the office. Of the 12 ministers in his new government, Ngendandumwe was the only parliamentarian; the other members were largely apolitical technocrats. Upon swearing in he announced a programme for "bread and peace", including an initiative to preserve coffee trees and an appeal to all citizens to provide two days of free labor to the country to bolster the state treasury. From this point onward the Mwami exerted considerable control over Burundian politics and made the cabinet responsible to him instead of Parliament. On 29 July he traveled to Brussels and signed several technical assistance and financial agreements with the Belgian government, including a loan of 65 million Belgian francs for economic development, subsidies for Burundian students at Belgian universities, and grantees of co-operation between Belgian and Burundian civil servants. 

In early 1964 Ngendandumwe went on a regional tour, visiting Kenya, Uganda, and Tanganyika to explore the possibility of Burundi joining the East African Common Services Organization and eventually a proposed East African Federation. He also established diplomatic relations with the People's Republic of China, upsetting the Mwami. On 31 March 1964 the Mwami dismissed four controversial cabinet members and asked Ngendandumwe to create a new government. A settlement was not reached and Ngendandumwe resigned on 6 April 1964. He was replaced by Albin Nyamoya. Despite this, he accompanied the Mwami to the United States in May to meet with President Lyndon B. Johnson.

Assassination 
On 7 January 1965 Mwambutsa called on Ngendandumwe to replace Nyamoya and form a new government. The appointment was protested by the Tutsi-dominated Rwagosore National Youth, the Federation of Burundian Workers, and the Union of Administration Agents. At noon on 15 January his new government was announced. Later that day he visited his wife at a hospital in Bujumbura to watch her give birth to their son. At about 8:00 PM, as he was leaving the hospital, he was shot in the back and killed. His death was reportedly instantaneous, while one of his aides was wounded by a stray bullet. His funeral was held three days later and he was succeeded in office by acting Prime Minister Pié Masumbuko. Ngendandumwe was the second Burundian premier to have been assassinated. His death created a political crisis, prompting Mwambutsa to dissolve Parliament and call for new elections. The Hutu-dominated Party of the People (PP), bolstered by UPRONA defections, saw a political opportunity and billed itself as a champion of the Monrovia group's ideas, renaming its youth wing the Jeunesse Populaire Ngendandumwe. UPRONA loyalist civil servants denounced the youth organisation as a group founded to "avenge" the late prime minister. UPRONA maintained its majority in the elections, but the PP earned 10 seats in Parliament.

The man accused of killing Ngendandumwe was Gonzalve Muyenzi, a Rwandan refugee who worked at the United States Embassy. Shortly after the murder several Rwandan refugees were arrested, including most of the leaders of the Armée Populaire de Libération Rwandaise.  The Burundian government also severed relations with China, but in March a Burundian diplomat declared that his government believed that both the United States and China were not involved in the killing. The police detained a man named Butera, another employee at the United States Embassy and the son of François Rukeba, a prominent Rwandan exile rebel leader. A ballistics expert alleged that the bullet which killed Ngendandumwe had been traced to a gun found in the possession of Butera. Also arrested were leading figures of the Casablanca group, including Nyamoa, Prime Niyongabo, and Zenon Nicanyenzi. The group had convened shortly before the murder and were accused of plotting it. Despite the arrests and several investigations, no members of the Casablanca group were ever prosecuted. In December 1967 the Supreme Court of Burundi, citing lack of evidence, dismissed all charges against those accused in the murder. The lack of a conviction for the murder became a grievance for Hutu opposition politicians.

Ngendandumwe was buried in the Vugizo area of Bujumbura, next to the tomb of Rwagosore. On 26 January 1965 the government voted to rename the Avenue de Hospital in Bujumbura—where he had been shot—as Avenue Pierre Ngendandumwe. The anniversary of Ngendandumwe's death in 1966 was declared a public holiday. He was also officially declared a "national hero" like Rwagasore, but his status in Burundian collective memory never became as prominent as that of the prince. In 2019 the Burundian government announced that it would name the planned building for the Senate in Gitega after Ngendandumwe.

Notes

References

Works cited 
 
 
 
 
 
 
 
 
 
 
 

1930 births
1965 deaths
Hutu people
Prime Ministers of Burundi
Assassinated Burundian politicians
People murdered in Burundi
Union for National Progress politicians
Lovanium University alumni